Khvorhesht (also Romanized as Khorhasht, Khūrhasht, and Khūrhesht; also known as Khuresh) is a village in Qaqazan-e Sharqi Rural District, in the Central District of Takestan County, Qazvin Province, Iran. At the 2006 census, its population was 1,757, in 387 families.

References 

Populated places in Takestan County